Georg Siimenson (14 April 1912 – 12 June 1978) was an Estonian international footballer who scored 13 goals in 42 games for the Estonian national side.

References
General
 Profile at Weltfußball.de

Specific

1912 births
1978 deaths
Estonian footballers
Estonia international footballers
Sportspeople from Narva

Association football forwards